Annarita Balzani (born 15 April, 1967 in Meldola) is a former Italian sprinter.

Biography
She won three medals at  senior level, two of these with the national relay team at International athletics competitions. She has 26 caps for the national team from 1983 to 1993. On 2 December 2012 she was elected federal advisor of the Federazione Italiana di Atletica Leggera (FIDAL), in the team of the new President .

Achievements

See also
 Italy national relay team - All the medals

References

External links
 

1967 births
Living people
Italian female sprinters
Italian female hurdlers
Universiade medalists in athletics (track and field)
World Athletics Championships athletes for Italy
Mediterranean Games silver medalists for Italy
Athletes (track and field) at the 1987 Mediterranean Games
Athletes (track and field) at the 1993 Mediterranean Games
Mediterranean Games medalists in athletics
Universiade bronze medalists for Italy
Medalists at the 1991 Summer Universiade